Randall Claude Weaver (January 3, 1948 – May 11, 2022) was an American survivalist, former Iowa factory worker, and self-proclaimed white separatist. He was a central actor in the 1992 Ruby Ridge standoff at his cabin near Naples, Idaho, that resulted in the deaths of his wife and son. Weaver was charged with murder, conspiracy, and assault as well as other crimes. He was acquitted of most of the charges, but was convicted of failing to appear in court on a previous weapons charge and sentenced to 18 months in prison. His family eventually received a total of $3,100,000 in compensation for the killing of his wife and son by federal agents.

Early life
Randy Weaver was born on January 3, 1948, to Clarence and Wilma Weaver, a farming couple in Villisca, Iowa. He was one of four children. The Weavers were deeply religious and had difficulty finding a denomination that matched their views; they often moved around among Evangelical, Presbyterian, and Baptist churches.

After graduating from Jefferson High School in 1966, he attended Iowa Central Community College before dropping out in 1968 after enlisting in the United States Army during the height of the Vietnam War and assigned to a Special Forces unit the Green Berets in a support role. He was stationed at Fort Bragg in North Carolina.

In 1970, Weaver returned to his hometown for a visit while on leave. During this leave, he first met his future wife, Victoria "Vicki" Jordison, introducing himself as "Pete", rather than his "hated" given name Randall.  By the time he was honorably discharged from the military, he had attained the rank of sergeant.

Ruby Ridge siege

Background 
A month after leaving the Army, Randy Weaver and Vicki Jordison married in a ceremony at the First Congregationalist Church in Fort Dodge, Iowa, in November 1971. After a semester at the University of Northern Iowa, Randy dropped out after finding well-paying work at a local John Deere factory. Vicki worked first as a secretary and then as a homemaker.

Partially as a result of reading the 1978 book The Late Great Planet Earth, the couple began to harbor more fundamentalist beliefs, with Vicki believing that the apocalypse was imminent. To follow Vicki's vision of her family surviving the apocalypse away from what they saw as a corrupt civilization, the Weaver family moved to a  property in remote Boundary County, Idaho, in 1983 and built a cabin there. They paid $5,000 in cash and traded their moving truck for the land, valued at $500 an acre.

In 1988, Weaver decided to run for county sheriff using the slogan "Get out of jail – free" and was adamant about his decision not to pay taxes.

While the Weavers subscribed to ideas that broadly fell under the category of Christian Identity, their beliefs were still different. Like many in that movement, Vicki Weaver developed a set of beliefs following Old Covenant Laws, and the family referred to God as Yahweh.

In 1989, Weaver met Kenneth Fadeley at an Aryan Nations meeting. Fadeley was actually an undercover ATF agent investigating the Aryan Nation complex under the alias "Gus Magisano". Weaver agreed to sell Fadeley two sawed-off shotguns. In December 1990, Weaver received felony weapons charges in connection with the 1989 transaction. During the initial encounter with Fadeley, the Weaver family relocated from a rental house to a cabin near Ruby Ridge, Idaho, in the Selkirk mountains. After charges were pressed against her husband, Vicki Weaver wrote to U.S. Attorney Maurice O. Ellsworth, addressing him as "Servant of the Queen of Babylon" and writing, "The stink of your lawless government has reached Heaven, the abode of Yahweh our Yashua", and "Whether we live or whether we die, we will not bow to your evil commandments."

At the time of the Ruby Ridge siege, the Weavers had four children: Sara, 16; Samuel, 14; Rachel, 10; and Elisheba, 10 months. Vicki homeschooled the children.

Siege 
Ruby Ridge was the site of an 11-day siege in 1992 in Boundary County, Idaho, near Naples. It began on August 21, when deputies of the United States Marshals Service (USMS) initiated action to apprehend and arrest Randy Weaver under a bench warrant after his failure to appear on a firearms charge. He had attempted to sell a pair of illegal sawed-off shotguns to a federal informer within the Aryan Nation white supremacist group. Weaver refused to surrender and remained at home with his family and friend Kevin Harris. The Hostage Rescue Team of the Federal Bureau of Investigation (FBI HRT) became involved as the siege developed.

During the Marshals Service reconnoiter of the Weaver property, six Marshals encountered Harris and Sammy Weaver, Randy's 14-year-old son, in woods near the family cabin. A shootout took place. Marshals shot the Weaver's dog Striker, then shot Sammy Weaver in the back as he ran away, killing him.  During the firefight, Harris shot Deputy U.S. Marshal William Francis Degan in the chest, resulting in Degan's death.

On August 22, 1992 FBI sniper/observers in the Hostage Rescue Team were dispatched to Ruby Ridge. The team used specified "Rules of Engagement" which allowed them to shoot any armed adult male exiting the cabin.

In the subsequent siege of the Weaver residence, led by the FBI, Weaver's wife Vicki was shot and killed by an FBI sniper while standing in her home holding her 10-month-old daughter. Harris was  critically wounded and almost died during the subsequent standoff.  Weaver was shot once; he was not holding a weapon at the time. All casualties occurred in the first two days of the operation. The siege and standoff were ultimately resolved by civilian negotiator Bo Gritz who was instrumental in getting Weaver to allow Harris to get medical attention. Harris surrendered and was arrested on August 30.  Weaver and his three daughters surrendered the next day after being convinced by Gritz that there was no other sensible solution.

Aftermath 
Weaver was charged with multiple crimes relating to the Ruby Ridge incident — a total of ten counts, including the original firearms charges. Attorney Gerry Spence handled Weaver's defense, and successfully argued that Weaver's actions were justifiable as self-defense. Spence did not call any witnesses for the defense, rather focusing on attacking the credibility of FBI agents and forensic technicians. The judge dismissed two counts after hearing prosecution witness testimony. The jury acquitted Weaver of all remaining charges except two, one of which the judge set aside. He was found guilty of one count, failure to appear, for which he was fined $10,000 and sentenced to 18 months in prison. He was credited with time served plus an additional three months, and he was then released. Kevin Harris was acquitted of all criminal charges.

In August 1995, the US government avoided trial on a civil lawsuit filed by the Weavers by awarding the three surviving daughters $1,000,000 each, and Randy Weaver $100,000 over the deaths of Sammy and Vicki Weaver.

Later life
Weaver testified about his racial beliefs before a U.S. Senate Judiciary subcommittee in 1995, saying, "I'm not a hateful racist as most people understand it. But I believe in the separation of races. We wanted to be separated from the rest of the world, to live in a remote area, to give our children a good place to grow up."

In 1995, Weaver was interviewed by New York Times reporter Ken Fuson and expressed regret about not appearing in court for his 1991 gun charge, saying "I'm not totally without fault in this."

In April 1996, Weaver accompanied Bo Gritz to Jordan, Montana, where Gritz was to attempt to negotiate a conclusion to the Montana Freemen standoff. However, Weaver was not allowed by the FBI to enter the Freemen's holdout.

In 1998, Weaver published The Federal Siege at Ruby Ridge: In Our Own Words, which he partly sold in person at gun shows.

In 1999, Weaver married Linda Gross, a legal secretary, in Jefferson, Iowa.

On June 18, 2007, Weaver participated in a press conference with tax protesters Edward and Elaine Brown on the front porch of their home in Plainfield, New Hampshire. He declared, "I ain't afraid of dying no more. I'm curious about the afterlife, and I'm an atheist."

Death 
Weaver's daughter Sara posted online that he had died on May 11, 2022, after being sick since at least mid-April. A cause of death was not given. He was 74 years old.

Appearance in media
Randy Weaver and the siege at Ruby Ridge have been the focus of several documentaries including the following:
 A CBS miniseries about the Ruby Ridge incident, titled The Siege at Ruby Ridge, aired on May 19 and 21, 1996. It was based on the book Every Knee Shall Bow by reporter Jess Walter. It starred Laura Dern as Vicki, Kirsten Dunst as Sara, and Randy Quaid as Randy. Later that year the television series was adapted as a full-length TV movie, The Siege at Ruby Ridge.
 PBS American Experience: "Ruby Ridge", February 14, 2017.
 "American Standoff," Retro Report / New York Times, October 26, 2014.
 Season 1, Episode 1: "The Legend of Ruby Ridge" of the documentary series The Secret Rulers of the World. – April 2001
 Atrocities at Ruby Ridge: the Randy Weaver Story, Produced by KPOC-TV 1995; VHS tape distributed by The FOREND Times, Inc.
 A&E Network American Justice series, episode 047 – "Deadly Force": A look at controversial law enforcement policy. Features the police bombing of the MOVE headquarters in Philadelphia, which killed 11, and the shootings of Randy Weaver's wife and son at Ruby Ridge. Bill Kurtis hosts.
 "Ruby Ridge Investigation", by Nightline 1995, ABC News .
 "Ruby Ridge", Reality Productions Group for TLC (The Learning Channel), television, 2000. Includes interviews with Randy and Rachel Weaver, FBI Site Commander Eugene Glenn, HRT Negotiator Fred Lanceley, civilian negotiators Bo Gritz and Jackie Brown, among others.
 The Ruby Ridge standoff was depicted in the 2018 miniseries Waco.

See also
 The Covenant, the Sword, and the Arm of the Lord
 FBI Critical Incident Response Group
 Rainbow Farm

References

External links
 "Idaho vs Randy Weaver" from the CourtTV Crime Library
 
 Summary of an Appeals Court ruling on Horiuchi; includes Special Rules of Engagement and a dissent by Judge Alex Kozinski

1948 births
2022 deaths
Christian Identity
American atheists
Members of the United States Army Special Forces
People acquitted of murder
Entrapment
Place of birth missing
People from Montgomery County, Iowa
United States Army soldiers
People from Boundary County, Idaho
Military personnel from Iowa
American white supremacists
American former Christians
Survivalists